The discography of American singer-songwriter Eden xo (formerly Jessie Malakouti) consists of four extended plays, twenty singles (including seven as a featured artist), three promotional singles, and fifteen music videos (including two as a featured artist).

Albums

Extended plays

Singles

As lead artist

As featured artist

Promotional singles

Songwriting

Music videos

As lead artist

As featured artist

References

American music